Faith Martin is a pen name of English author Jacquie Walton, who is best known for her popular detective series, starring Detective Inspector (DI) Hillary Greene. She also writes under the pen names Maxine Barry and Joyce Cato.

Life 
Walton was born in Oxford. She attended a secretarial college, and then worked as a secretary at Somerville College for six years. During this time she was supporting her parents, after they were injured in a motor vehicle accident. When they received compensation for their injuries, she was able to take leave from her job for a year, in order to write. She now lives in an Oxfordshire village.

Writing

Maxine Barry romance 
Walton began her career writing romance novels using the pen name Maxine Barry. Her first novel, Stolen Fire, set in Hawaii, was published in 1993. She wrote thirteen other romance novels, which were published by the imprints Scarlet and Heartline.

Faith Martin: DI Hillary Greene Series 
Walton is best known for writing a series of detective novels under the pen name Faith Martin. They are set in Oxfordshire, with the lead character being CID DI Hillary Greene, who works out of Thames Valley Police headquarters in Kidlington and lives on a narrowboat. All of the books in this series have the word 'narrow' in the original title.

Whereas Inspector Morse spent his time solving the surprisingly large number of murder cases in the city of Oxford, DI Hillary Greene works in the towns and villages in the north of Oxfordshire, where there are also a large number of such cases.

The Hillary Greene books were fairly successful when they were first released. Then, in 2008, Blackstar Crime republished A Narrow Escape, which was very successful, and was followed by On the Straight and Narrow. Subsequently, Joffe Books republished the Hillary Greene series under new titles, which almost all contain the word 'murder'.

The following table shows the original titles and the new titles:

Joyce Cato: non-series and Jenny Starling series 
Under the pen name Joyce Cato, Walton also writes stand-alone detective novels and the Jenny Starling murder mysteries.

Ryder and Loveday series 
Set in the city of Oxford, this series features Probationary WPC Trudy Loveday and coroner Clement Ryder.

References

External links 
 Author interview on BBC Oxford (Youtube)

English crime fiction writers
Writers from Oxford
Year of birth missing (living people)
Living people
Pseudonymous women writers
Women crime fiction writers
English romantic fiction writers
Women romantic fiction writers
20th-century English novelists
20th-century English women writers
21st-century English novelists
21st-century English women writers
20th-century pseudonymous writers
21st-century pseudonymous writers